Movie Greats of the 60s is a studio album recorded by American entertainer Connie Francis. The album features songs from the soundtracks of then current and/or recent motion pictures.

Background
The recording of the featured songs spanned a period of more than a year, beginning with the March 24, 1965 recording of "Forget Domani": the album's most recently recorded track was "Somewhere, My Love (Lara's Theme)" recorded on May 31, 1966. During the sessions, Francis worked with several renowned arrangers and orchestra leaders such as Frank De Vol, Benny Golson and Don Costa.

The album was released in July 1966 as MGM Records 12" album E-4382 (mono pressings) and SE-4382 (stereo pressings).

In May 1967, Francis used the instrumental playbacks of nine of the album's featured songs and overdubbed Spanish vocals. "Dance My Trouble Away", "I Will Wait for You", and "The Phoenix Love Theme (Senza fine)" were omitted and not re-recorded in Spanish. By adding "Donde hay chicos" (already recorded in 1960), the Spanish version of "Where the Boys Are", the title song from Francis' own film of the same name, a set of ten Spanish songs was compiled and released in July 1967 as a 12" album under the name Grandes exitos del cine de los años 60. With an identical cover design, Grandes exitos del cine de los años 60 was virtually the Spanish edition of Movie Greats of the 60s with a slightly modified track listing.

Track listing

Side A

Side B

References

Connie Francis albums
1966 albums
MGM Records albums
Albums produced by Tom Wilson (record producer)